A molfar is a person with purported magical abilities in Hutsul culture. Their abilities focus around herbalism and other folk magic.

The origin of the word is uncertain. It may originate from Romance languages, e.g., Italian malfare 'to do evil'.

Molfar culture was popularised by Mykhailo Kotsiubynsky's book Shadows of Forgotten Ancestors, published in 1911, and a subsequent film made in 1964.

A prominent Carpathian molfar was Mykhailo Nechay, who lived in Verkhniy Yaseniv and was killed in 2011.

References

Literature 
 Войтович В. Мольфар // Українська міфологія — К.: Либідь, 2005. — С. 321.
 Килимник С. Український рік у народних звичаях в історичному висвітленні. — К.: Обереги, 1994. — Кн. 2. Т. IV. — С. 445.
 Михайлов Н. А. Укр. мольфар, слвн. malavar и др. Демонологическая параллель // Балканские чтения 9. Terra balcanica. Terra slavica. К юбилею Татьяны Владимировны Цивьян. — М.: Институт славяноведения РАН, 2007. — С. 93-97.
 Мольфар // Етимологічний словник української мови. — К.: Наукова думка, 1989. — С. 506.
 Шевчук В. Мисленне дерево. — К.: Молодь, 1989. — С. 178.

External links
 Carpathian Molfars

Hutsuls
Witchcraft in Ukraine